Dearmid O'Cuana (died 1248), also spelled Dairmid O'Cuana, was a priest of the Diocese of Elphin in what is now County Sligo, Ireland. He is referred to by two sources as the "great priest of Elphin."

From the Annála Connacht (Annals of Loc Ce) of 1248 (Author: [unknown]):
1248.2 Diarmait O Cuanna, the great priest of Elphin, died and was buried at Kilmore.

Sources 

Rootsweb.com''
 GoIreland.com

13th-century Irish Roman Catholic priests
1248 deaths
Year of birth unknown